Kisshōten (lit. "Auspicious Heavens"), also known as Kichijōten, Kisshoutennyo (吉祥天女), Kudokuten (功徳天) is a Japanese female deity, adapted via Buddhism from the Hindu goddess Lakshmi. Kisshoutennyo is sometimes named as one of the Seven Gods of Fortune (fukujin), replacing either Jurōjin or Fukurokuju.  For example, in the 1783 edition of the Butsuzōzui compendium (reprinted in 1796), Kichijōten replaces Fukurokuju as one of the seven fukujin.  She is considered to be the goddess of happiness, fertility, and beauty.  Kisshoutennyo's iconography is distinguished by the Nyoihōju gem (如意宝珠) in her hand, Kisshōten and the Nyoihōju gem are both represented by the symbol of the kagome.

When Kisshoutennyo is counted among the seven fukujin and fellow Fukujin Daikoku is regarded in feminine form, all three of the Hindu Tridevi goddesses are represented in the Fukujin, with Daikoku representing Parvati and Benzaiten representing Saraswati.

See also
 Nyoihōju (如意宝珠) wishing gem
 Fukujin (福神) deities
 Buddhist Tenbu (天部) deities
 Hinduism in Japan
 Lakshmi
 Star of Lakshmi
 Ashtalakshmi
 Vasudhara (Bodhisattva of good fortune, wealth, fertility, prosperity)
 Kagome crest
 Kagome lattice
 Hexagram
 Octagram
 Hexagon
 Octagon
 Satkona
 Kisshō Tennyo (manga)

References

Buddhist goddesses
Fertility goddesses
Japanese goddesses
Beauty goddesses
Fortune goddesses
Twenty-Four Protective Deities